The 1975 Austrian Open  was a combined men's and women's tennis tournament played on outdoor clay courts. It was categorized as Grade B tournament and was part of the 1975 Commercial Union Assurance Grand Prix circuit. It took place at the Tennis stadium Kitzbühel in Kitzbühel Austria and was held from 7 July through 13 July 1975. Adriano Panatta and Sue Barker won the singles titles.

Finals

Men's singles
 Adriano Panatta defeated  Jan Kodeš 2–6, 6–2, 7–5, 6–4

Women's singles
 Sue Barker defeated  Pam Teeguarden 6–4, 6–4

Men's doubles
 Paolo Bertolucci /  Adriano Panatta defeated  Patrice Dominguez /  François Jauffret 6–2, 6–2, 7–6

Women's doubles
 Sue Barker /  Pam Teeguarden defeated  Fiorella Bonicelli /  Raquel Giscafré 6–4, 6–3

References

External links
 ITF – Tournament edition details

Austrian Open
Austrian Open Kitzbühel
1975 WTA Tour
Austrian Open